Chloroaniline may refer to any of three isomeric chemical compounds:

 
 3-Chloroaniline
 4-Chloroaniline